Footpath is a 1953 Hindi film written and directed by Zia Sarhadi. It stars Dilip Kumar, Meena Kumari in lead roles. The music of the film is by Khayyam and background score by Timir Baran.

Plot
The story is about black-marketeering in grains and medicines, a subject of perennial interest to everybody and of poignant importance to the poor and needy. The characters and drama are laid among the very poor, the homeless ones, the pavement dwellers, whence the picture derives its title. One of them, the central character, is a poorly-paid hack journalist named Noshu who lives, for lack of means, with his kindly elder brother Bani and Bani's nasty wife, Minna. Powerfully attracted to a pretty young girl of the neighborhood and wanting desperately to woo and win her, he decides to become a black-marketeer.

The path of the transgressor is laid with roses. He mints money, becomes a wealthy and a respected citizen, and has everything he hankered for in his new world of luxurious ease. It all turns to ashes in his mouth. His brother, who brought him up and who has lost his teacher's job because he used the school's money to finance Noshu's first flutter, turns him out when he discovers what the money was for. So do his poor but honest friends.

With a hardened heart, Noshu goes his own way, becoming more wealthy at each step. Awakening comes with the outbreak of an epidemic among the starving poor. With his racket in medicines, Noshu's conscience stirs in him as he sees the people he loved agonize and die for lack of the drugs he is hoarding for peak prices. The climax comes in his soul when he rushes to his stricken brother's side too late and arrives just as Bani breathes his last. Shocked into realization, Noshu repents, gives himself up to the police, denounces his companions in crime and goes to prison.

Cast
 Dilip Kumar as Noshu
 Meena Kumari as Mala
 Achala Sachdev as Meena
 Anwar Hussain as Ram					
 Jankidas as Mathur	
 Jagdeep as Pickpocket				
 Romi as Monu

Soundtrack
all songs are penned by Majrooh Sultanpuri except " kaisa jadu dala re" which is by Ali sardar jaffri.

External links 
 

1953 films
1950s Hindi-language films
Films scored by Khayyam
Indian black-and-white films